The Leased Territory of Weihaiwei used revenue stamps from 1921 to 1930. The only issue consisted of British King George V keytypes overprinted WEIHAIWEI and a value in cents or dollars. Five values were issued: 1c (on 1d), 2c (on 2d), 10c (on 3d), 50c (on 1s) and $1 (on 1s). The 10c on 3d also exists with additional handstamped surcharges of 1c and 2c. These revenues were withdrawn in 1930 when the leased territory was handed back to China. All of Weihaiwei's revenues are scarce or rare and are highly sought after by collectors.

See also
Revenue stamps of China
Revenue stamps of Hong Kong

References

Further reading
 Clarke, H.B.R. "Wei Hai Wei". Collectors Club Philatelist. Vol. 30 No. 3 (May 1951), p. 115-128.
 Goldsmith, Michael and Charles W. Goodwyn, The Crown Colony of Wei Hai Wei: 24 May 1898 to 1 October 1930. London: Royal Philatelic Society, 1985  41p.

Philately of China
Economy of China
Weihaiwei
Weihaiwei under British rule